Anna Mathias is an American actress.

Filmography

 The Streets of San Francisco
 The Ghost of Flight 401
 Lou Grant
 Backstairs at the White House
 CHiPs
 Pray TV
 B.J. and the Bear
 Eating Raoul
 Pink Lady
 Hill Street Blues
 The Rodney Dangerfield Special: I Can't Take It No More
 Footlight Frenzy
 Night of the Comet
 CBS Storybreak
 Once Bitten
 George Burns Comedy Week
 Bright Lights, Big City
 Rain Man
 Police Academy 6: City Under Siege
 A Family for Joe
 Sunset Grill
 A Dangerous Woman
 Where on Earth Is Carmen Sandiego?
 Shadow of Obsession
 The Secretary
 Liz: The Elizabeth Taylor Story
 All-New Dennis the Menace
 A Christmas Carol
 Beverly Hills Ninja
 Mother Teresa: In the Name of God's Poor
 Once and Again
 Mary, Mother of Jesus
 The Vest
 McBride: Murder Past Midnight
 Domestic Import

External links

Living people
American actresses
Year of birth missing (living people)
21st-century American women